"Teaching to the test" is a colloquial term for any method of education whose curriculum is heavily focused on preparing students for a standardized test.

Opponents of this practice argue that it forces teachers to limit curriculum to a set range of knowledge or skills in order to increase student performance on the mandated test. This produces an unhealthy focus on excessive repetition of simple, isolated skills ("drill and kill") and limits the teacher's ability to foster a holistic understanding of the subject matter. With high-stakes testing impeding over every decision teachers make, they are often forced to teach to the tests rather than to their students. This can drain instruction of passion and meaning as students are taught information from a bare-bones curriculum. This would be an incidence of Campbell's law, the general principle that a social indicator distorts the process it is intended to monitor. Furthermore, opponents argue, teachers who engage in it are typically below-average teachers.
Some research suggests that teaching to the test is ineffective and often does not achieve its primary goal of raising student scores.

Activities
The usual method of teaching to the test is to give specific information, then test it at the end of each unit. Typically, these are tests of rote procedures and memorized facts, rather than of understanding or logical thinking. Teaching to the test is also frequently used for skill-based learning, like typing or athletics; in this context, teaching to the test is the dominant practice.

Teaching to the test may misrepresent students' true learning. For example, students who have learned vocabulary words for a reading test will score well even though they cannot use a broad vocabulary. In mathematics, students drilled on only test-like questions often can not correctly answer questions that assess the same skill or concept in a different way. According to Craig Jerald, one study has shown that in a district that relied heavily on item drilling, 83 percent of students selected the correct answer to a multiple-choice item "87 − 24 =." However, only 66 percent could correctly answer the equivalent non-drilled item "Subtract 24 from 87."

Criticism
The No Child Left Behind Act, which placed a far higher emphasis than before on the evaluation of schools' effectiveness through standardized tests, could hypothetically be considered to have been a step in the wrong direction for USA schooling. Teaching to the test is frequently criticized by academics and educators, while its critics argue that students who are simply taught to the test fail to achieve a lasting and truly comprehensive understanding of the subject matter. Even if students score better on tests, something which different studies have not confirmed, critics worry students may not truly grasp the domain's key concepts, as teaching to the test centers on rote memorization while excluding the building of creative skills and abstract-thinking abilities. According to Richard D. Kahlenber, both teachers and students spend most of their time studying textbook concepts to prepare for exams, despite morality, aesthetic, life skills, and, depending on the student's ambitions, creativity being more important for success. According to critics, educational systems that center on standardized tests do not truly educate students or provide them with the ability to fulfill the needs of their future lives.

The practice has also been shown to reduce the validity of standardized tests, and can create an incorrect profile of a student's achievement. Dr. Louis Volante, an associate professor at Brock University, observed that test scores are, for many reasons, not necessarily a fair indicator of a student's ability. Some students who master class materials through homework or study may not succeed in testing environments due to a lack of test-taking skills.

WNBC-TV senior correspondent Gabe Pressman expressed another concern about teaching to the test; benchmarks for standardized tests can sometimes be affected by political pressures. In many cases test scores are dumbed down to achieve the forecasted figures; as a result, improvement in standardized tests result does not always represent students' real level of skill.

W. James Popham, an emeritus professor at University of California Graduate School of Education Studies, also claimed that standardized tests are not a level playing field for students with different backgrounds. The high-stakes exam would be a larger challenge to international students, who probably have had different class materials and learning methods. If teaching to the test remains prevalent in the U.S. education system, the course-drop rates of new immigrants are likely to be high.

Ethics
A 1989 study on teaching to the test evaluated the ethical "continuum" of the practice, and identified seven practice points, ranging from most to least ethical:
 General instruction on local objectives
 Instruction on general test-taking skills
 Instruction on objectives generally measured by standardized tests
 Instruction on objectives specific to the test used
 Instruction on objectives specific to the test used and using the same format
 Instruction using a released test or a "clone" test that replicates the format and content of the test used
 Instruction using the test to be used, either before or during test administration
The study concluded that the ethical boundary fell between points three and five, with points one and two being ethical and points six and seven being unethical.

In practice
The federal No Child Left Behind Act in the United States has increased the practice of teaching to the test because of its emphasis on standardized test scores; this is especially true in schools with disadvantaged students, which rely heavily on government funding. Test-preparation courses and cram schools are limited examples of teaching to the test.

See also

 Campbell's Law
 Education in the United States
Maotanchang Middle School
 Washback effect, the general phenomenon which gives rise to teaching to the test
 Overfitting, a similar problem in statistics and optimization problems
 Volvo effect

References

Further reading
 
 
 

Educational assessment and evaluation